The Creighton Model FertilityCare System (Creighton Model, FertilityCare, CrMS) is a form of natural family planning which involves identifying the fertile period during a woman's menstrual cycle.  The Creighton Model was developed by Thomas Hilgers, the founder and director of the Pope Paul VI Institute.  This model, like the Billings ovulation method, is based on observations of cervical mucus to track fertility.  Creighton can be used for both avoiding pregnancy and achieving pregnancy.

Conceptual basis 

Hilgers describes the Creighton Model as being based on "a standardized modification of the Billings ovulation method (BOM)", which was developed by John and Evelyn Billings in the 1960s. The Billingses issued a paper refuting the claim that the CrMS represents a standardization of the BOM. According to the Billingses said that those concepts are two different methods and should not be seen as interchangeable.

Effectiveness 
For avoiding pregnancy, the perfect-use failure rate of Creighton was 0.5%, which means that for each year that 1,000 couples using this method perfectly, that there are 5 unintended pregnancies.  The typical-use failure rate, representing the fraction of couples using this method that actually had an unintended pregnancy, is reported as 3.2%.

For achieving pregnancy, no large clinical trials have been performed comparing ART and NaProTechnology. Only observational one-arm studies have been published so far. In the larger of these three studies, 75% of couples trying to conceive received additional hormonal stimulation such as clomiphene.

References

Further reading 
 Hilgers, Thomas W., M.D., The NaPro Technology Revolution: unleashing the Power in a Woman's Cycle. New York: Beaufort Books, 2010. Print.
 Hilgers, Thomas W. The Medical & Surgical Practice of NaProTECHNOLOGY. Omaha: Pope Paul VI Institute, 2004. N. pag. Print.
 Moore, Keith L., T, V.N Persaud, and Mark G. Torchia. Before we are Born Essentials of Embryology and Birth Defects. 8th ed. Philadelphia: Elsevier Inc., 2013. Print.
 Unleashing the Power of a Woman's Cycle. Pope Paul VI Institute, 2006. Web. 14 Nov. 2012. <http://www.naprotechnology.com/index.html>.
 Jemelka, B. E., & Parker, D. W., & Mirkes, R. (2013). «NapProTECHNOLOGY and Conscientious OB/GYN Medicine». American Medical Association Journal of Ethics, 15. 
 Hilgers, T. W. (2011). The New Women’s Health Science of NaProTECHNOLOGY. Archives of Perinatal Medicine, 17(4). Retrieved from https://web.archive.org/web/20150824051921/http://fertilitycare.net/documents/APM174-2-Hilgers.pdf

  Hilgers, TW; Stanford, JB (1998). "Creighton Model NaProEducation Technology for avoiding pregnancy. Use effectiveness". The Journal of Reproductive Medicine. 43 (6): 495–502. .
 Lora, José María Murcia; Martínez, Oscar Martínez; Simoni, Jennifer; Calvo, Marian Martínez; Andrés, Alberto Falces de; Mejía, Jorge Enrique; Simoni, Diglio; Alcázar, Juan Luis (2022). «Fertile window and biophysical biomarkers of cervical secretion in subfertile cycles: a look at biotechnology applied to NaProTechnology». Clinical and Experimental Obstetrics & Gynecology 49 (1): 17. . .

External links
Creighton Model official site
Pope Paul VI Institute for the Study of Human Reproduction
Interview With Dr. Thomas Hilgers, Director of the Pope Paul VI Institute 

Fertility awareness